Charles Entertainment Cheese, or Chuck E. Cheese for short, is the mascot of the Chuck E. Cheese chain of family restaurants. From 1977 to 1992 he was an anthropomorphic rat, changing to a mouse in 1993. In 2012, he was rebranded into a smaller, “hipper” version in an attempt to increase sales.

First appearance 
The character was originally created as the mascot for a restaurant proposed by Nolan Bushnell (founder of Atari) in 1977. Bushnell attended the International Association of Amusement Parks and Attractions (IAAPA) conference in Orlando and saw walk-around character costumes for sale. Among them, Bushnell spotted a costume that appeared to be a coyote, so he bought it for his planned Coyote Pizza restaurant. When the costume arrived at Atari, it was discovered that the costume was actually a rat with a long pink tail; this costume was also much larger and furrier than the final product seen in all of the original locations. Bushnell decided to change the restaurant's name to Rick Rat's Pizza. However, Bushnell's group of planners believed that a rat for the name of a restaurant would not be appropriate. Bushnell's group of planners finally decided on the name Chuck E. Cheese for the mascot and changed the restaurant's name to Chuck E. Cheese's Pizza Time Theatre. The first Chuck E. Cheese's Pizza Time Theatre opened in San Jose, California, in the same year Chuck E. Cheese was proposed — 1977.

Characterizations 
The rat mascot was originally given a New Jersey accent, telling jokes- sometimes holding a cigar. His voice was delivered by John Widelock for the first seven years, then by Scott Wilson. In 1993, Duncan Brannan was hired as the new voice of the mascot, with the task of transforming him from a rat to a mouse. By 1995, the mouse was given a more child-friendly makeover, with a wider cheek structure, a less pointy, shorter snout, longer eyes, smaller ears, and a slimmer physique. This version started appearing in the restaurants in 2001.

In July 2012, the mascot was changed into a much smaller version of the character, who played electric guitar. Brannan was replaced with Jaret Reddick, the frontman and guitarist for the pop punk band Bowling for Soup.

References 

Corporate mascots
Food advertising characters
Mascots introduced in 1977
Fictional mice and rats
Fictional musicians
Fictional orphans
Fictional restaurant staff
Rodent mascots
Male characters in advertising